Elitedivisionen 2015-16 (or 3F-ligaen due to sponsorship reasons) was the 44th edition of Denmark women's football premier league. It is controlled by the DBU. It ran from 8 August 2015 to 18 June 2016.

Format
The eight teams play each other twice for a total of 14 matches per team. After that the top six teams play the championship round and the bottom two teams play the qualification round.

In the championship round, each of the six teams play each other twice. Points accumulated at the regular season are halved and added the points from this round. The champion and runners-up qualify for the 2016–17 UEFA Women's Champions League.

In the qualification round, the two bottom teams of the regular season are joined by the top four teams of the Kvinde 1. division, each of the six teams play each other twice. All teams start this round on 0 points, the top two teams qualify to 2016–17 Elitedivisionen and the remaining four teams qualify to the 2016–17 Kvinde 1. division.

Teams

Regular season

League table

Results

Final stage

Championship round
Played by the teams placed first to sixth in the regular season. Teams play each other twice and points accumulated at the regular season are halved and added to this stage.

Qualification round
Played by the teams placed seventh and eighth of the regular season which are joined by the top four teams from 2015–16 Kvinde 1. division. Teams play each other twice.

Top scorers

References 

1
Denmark
Elitedivisionen seasons